Kissos is a mountain village in the municipal unit of Mouresi, in the eastern part of Magnesia, Greece. It sits on the eastern slopes of the forested Pelion mountains, at about 500 meters elevation, 3 km from the Aegean Sea to the northeast. It is located 3 km west of Mouresi, 5 km southeast of Zagora and 17 km east of the city of Volos (Magnesia's capital). 

Kissos was the original home of Kyriazis Hadji-Kyriazis (b. 1817), founder of the dynasty of tobacco merchants and producers which eventually got to great prominence in Egypt as "Kyriazi freres".

The church of Agia Marina, which dates back to the 17th century, is located in Kissos. The church was built in 1650 during the Turkish occupation of Greece. The size of the church and the fact that it was built in the main square of the village suggest that the church was built with the permission of the Turks. The church is beautifully decorated inside with frescoes and wooden carved iconostases.

The village is also the site of the Ecclesiastic Museum of Aghia Marina.

Population

External links
Homepage of Kissos on its municipality's homepage

See also
List of settlements in the Magnesia regional unit

References

Populated places in Pelion